Will You Still Love Me? is an EP by Julie Doiron, released in 1999.

Critical reception
AllMusic called the EP a "powerful, maturing work" where "the guitar picking style sounds like a merry-go-round, starting up and slowing down according to emotion through the music and singing."

Track listing
 "He Will Forget" - 4:04
 "Again, Again" - 3:22
 "Stay Now, Then Go" - 2:56
 "Will You Still Love Me in December" - 2:51
 "For Me" - 5:05

References

1999 EPs
Julie Doiron albums